PmWiki is wiki software written by Patrick R. Michaud in the PHP programming language,
and since January 2009 it is actively maintained by Petko Yotov under the oversight of Dr. Michaud.

It is free software, licensed under the terms of the GNU General Public License.

Design focus
PmWiki software focuses on ease-of-use, so people with little IT or wiki experience will be able to put it to use.  The software is also designed to be extensible and customizable. The PmWiki philosophy favours writers over readers, doesn't try to replace HTML and supports collaborative maintenance of public web pages.

Besides the usual collaborative features such as content management and knowledge base, PmWiki has been used by companies or groups as an internal communication platform with task management and meeting archives. It is also used by university and research teams.

The PmWiki wiki markup shares similarities with MediaWiki (used by Wikipedia) and has a large number of features not found in other wiki engines however its primary goal is to help with the collaborative maintenance of websites. The PmWiki markup engine is highly customizable, allowing adding, modifying or disabling markup rules, and it can support other markup languages. As an example, the Creole specifications can be enabled.

Features

Content storage
PmWiki uses regular files to store content. Each page of the wiki is stored in its own file on the web server. Pages are stored in ASCII or Unicode format and may be edited directly by the wiki administrator. According to the author, "For the standard operations (view, edit, page revisions), holding the information in flat files is clearly faster than accessing them in a database..."

PmWiki is designed to be able to store and retrieve the pages' text and metadata on various systems and formats. It does not support databases in its default installation. However, via plug-ins, PmWiki can use MySQL or SQLite databases for data storage.

PmWiki supports "attachments" (uploads: images or other files) to its wiki pages. The uploads can be attached to a group of pages (default), individually to each page, or to the whole wiki, depending on the content needs and structure. There are PmWiki recipes allowing an easier management of the uploaded files, e.g. deletion or thumbnail/gallery creation.

Wiki structure
In PmWiki, wiki pages are contained within "wiki groups" (or "namespaces"). Each wiki group can have its own configuration options, plug-ins, access control, skin, sidebar (menu), language of the content and of the interface.

By default, PmWiki allows exactly one hierarchical level of the pages ("WikiGroup/WikiPage"), but through recipes, it is possible to have a flat structure (no wiki groups), multiple nested groups, or sub-pages.

Special wiki groups are "PmWiki", Site, SiteAdmin and Category which contain the documentation and some configuration templates.

Templates (skins)
PmWiki offers a skin template scheme that makes it possible to change the look and feel of the wiki or website with a high degree of flexibility in both functionality and appearance.

Access control
PmWiki permits users and administrators to establish password protection for individual pages, groups of pages or the entire site.  For example, defined zones may be established to enable collaborative work by certain groups, such as in a company intranet.

Password protection can be applied to reading, editing, uploading to and changing passwords for the restricted zone. The out-of-the box installation uses "shared passwords" rather than login names, but a built-in option can enable a sophisticated user/group based access control system on pages, groups of pages or the whole wiki.

PmWiki can use passwords from config files, special wiki pages, .htpasswd/.htgroup files. There are also user-based authorization possibilities and authentication via various external sources (e.g. LDAP, forum databases etc.).

Customization
PmWiki follows a design philosophy with the main objectives of ease of installation, maintainability, and keeping non-required features out of the core distribution of the software.  PmWiki's design encourages customization with a wide selection of custom extensions, known as "recipes" available from the PmWiki Cookbook. Creating and maintaining extensions and custom installations is easy thanks to a number of well documented hooks in the wiki engine.

System requirements
Prerequisites for running the PmWiki wiki engine:

 Any supported version of PHP
 Any webserver (or hosting plan) that can run PHP scripts (e.g. Apache HTTP Server, Microsoft Microsoft IIS, Lighttpd, Hiawatha, Cherokee). 
 Write permissions for the webserver user account in the PmWiki tree (required for off-line editing only)
 No file type extension restrictions on the webserver (sometimes a problem with free web hosting providers)
 There is a "recipe" to allow running PmWiki "Standalone", without a webserver, for example from a Flash USB stick.

Author
PmWiki was written by the university professor and Perl 6 developer Patrick R. Michaud, who owns a trademark on the name "PmWiki". A number of other developers and users write, maintain and discuss "recipes" (special purpose configurations, add-ons, or plug-ins) in the PmWiki Cookbook and "skins" (special purpose alteration to the look and feel of pages).

Books and articles about PmWiki 
The following books mention PmWiki or have dedicated chapters or sections:
 Todd Stauffer, How to Do Everything With Your Web 2.0 Blog, 
 White, Pauxtis, Web 2.0 for Business: Learning the New Tools, 
 Nancy Courtney, More Technology for the Rest of Us: A Second Primer on Computing for the Non-IT Librarian, 
 Holtz, Demopoulos, Blogging for Business: Everything You Need to Know And Why You Should Care, 
 Ebersbach, Glaser, Heigl, Wiki: Kooperation Im Web, 
 Lange, Christoph (ed.): Wikis und Blogs - Planen, Einrichten, Verwalten, C&L 2006 (German) 

PmWiki has been featured in a number of printed and online magazines including 
Inc Magazine, Linux Gazette, PCMag,
LXer, Framasoft, Linuxfr''.

The page PmWiki References lists publications about PmWiki in various languages.

See also

Comparison of wiki software
WikiWikiWeb

References

External links
 PmWiki Home Page

Free wiki software
Free software programmed in PHP
Free content management systems